Landisville is an unincorporated community and census-designated place (CDP) in East Hempfield Township, Lancaster County, Pennsylvania, United States. As of the 2010 census the population was 1,893. The community was once part of the Salunga-Landisville CDP, before splitting into two separate CDPs for the 2010 census, the other being Salunga.

Geography
PA 283 leads southeast to Lancaster and northwest  to Harrisburg, the state capital.

The community drains east to Swarr Run, a southeast-flowing tributary of Little Conestoga Creek and part of the Conestoga River watershed flowing to the Susquehanna River.

Climate

Demographics

References

External links

Census-designated places in Lancaster County, Pennsylvania
Census-designated places in Pennsylvania